The Riverin River is a river in the Côte-Nord region of the province of Quebec, Canada. It is a tributary of the Gulf of Saint Lawrence.
There is a small hydroelectric power plant near the mouth of the river.

Location

The Riverin River is in Port-Cartier, Sept-Rivières, Quebec.
The river is fed by a few relatively small lakes, including Lac Riverin in the canton of Grenier.
It flows southward, with many rapids.
At its mouth, it flows under Quebec Route 138 and into the Saint Lawrence just north of the community of Rivière-Pentecôte.
 of the river basin, or 26.5%, is in the Port-Cartier–Sept-Îles Wildlife Reserve.

Climate models indicate that further inland the average annual temperature would be  and the average annual rainfall would be .

Name

The Pessamit Innu, called Riverin by the Europeans, hunted and fished by the river until around 1900.
The name of the river, which dates back to at least 1913, reflects the presence of these people in the area.

River

An unnamed fall  from the mouth prevents saltwater tides from flowing further upstream.

The Riverin River is not recognized as a salmon river. 
There are rainbow smelt (Osmerus mordax) at the mouth of the river, and other fish include American eel (Anguilla rostrata), brook trout (Salvelinus fontinalis) and three-spined stickleback (Gasterosteus aculeatus).

Dam

The dam was built in 1946.
The present 2.01 MW power plant is owned by Pouvoir Riverin and Algonquin Power Fund (Canada) and came into operation in 1999.

Watershed

To the east the watershed is bordered by the watershed of the Pentecôte River, and to the north and west by the watershed of the Aux Rochers.
Beyond this the river basin is in a rocky plateau with rounded hills, sometimes with steep slopes.

The land is based on magmatic rocks, including assemblages of anorthosite and gabbro-norite, syenite, monzonite, granodiorite and diorite, migmatite, granite and pegmatite.
In the plateau the bedrock is often exposed in outcroppings, or is covered with a thin layer of soil.
The coastal plain has large amounts of clay and silt sediments deposited by the Goldthwait Sea after the glaciers withdrew, which were then covered by coarser sandy estuarine and deltaic sediments.
Wetlands account for 5.63% of the basin, and are found on the coastal plain in flat areas with fine sediments.
Upstream, the rivers follow angular courses dictated by fractures in the bedrock.
In the coastal plain the rivers develop meanders in the loose sediments.

Lakes
Lakes in the watershed include:

Notes

Sources

Rivers of Côte-Nord